A Life in the Day of B19: Tales of the Tower Block is a 2006 album by Soweto Kinch.

Track listing
All tracks are written by Soweto Kinch.

 "The Opening Theme" (1:17)
 "The Mission / Skit 1 – The Tower Block" (6:47)
 "10.30 Appointment / Skit 2 – In the Rain" (6:45)
 "Adrian's Ballad / Skit 3 – Under the Bus Shelter" (4:49)
 "Love Gamble / Skit 4 – Back in the Council High Rise" (4:25)
 "Ridez / Skit 5 – Marcus' Flat" (5:09)
 "Padz / Skit 6 – Marcus' Crisis" (5:33)
 "Marcus' Crisis / Skit 7 – Well MC" (4:51)
 "So! / Skit 8 – Adrian's Dreams" (7:20)
 "Expansion / Skit 9 – Parting in the Clouds" (3:19)
 "Out There / Skit 10 – The Court" (4:53)
 "A Friendly Game of Basketball / Skit 11 – The Platform / Skit 12 – The Train That Never Came" (6:50)
 "Everybody Raps – Skit 13 – Why Don't We All Team Up" (5:42)
 "Who Knows? / Skit 14 – Adrian's New Property" (4:56)
 "The House That Love Built / Skit 15 – Into the Basement" (6:10)

Personnel
 Soweto Kinch – alto saxophone, rap vocals, tenor saxophone
 Abram Wilson – trumpet
 Denys Baptiste – tenor saxophone
 Harry Brown – trombone
 Femi Temowo – guitar
 Michael Olatuja – bass
 Troy Miller – drums
 Moira Stuart – narration (track 1, skit 4, skit 5, skits 7–9, skit 12, skits 14 and 15)
Additional vocals provided by
 Perge
 Toyin Kinch
 Kim Trusty
 Jonathan Kidd
 Breis
 Francis Mott
 Jonzi D
 Dannie Hoch

References

2006 albums
Soweto Kinch albums
Albums produced by Tony Platt